Jane Waddington Wyatt (August 12, 1910 – October 20, 2006) was an American actress. She starred in a number of Hollywood films, such as Frank Capra's Lost Horizon, but is likely best known for her role as the housewife and mother Margaret Anderson on the CBS and NBC television comedy series Father Knows Best, and as Amanda Grayson, the human mother of Spock on the science-fiction television series Star Trek. Wyatt was a three-time Emmy Award–winner.

Early life
Wyatt was born on August 12, 1910, in Campgaw, a neighborhood in Franklin Lakes, New Jersey, and raised in Manhattan. Her father, Christopher Billopp Wyatt, was a broker. Her mother was Euphemia Van Rensselaer Wyatt. Wyatt had two sisters and a brother.

Education
While in New York City, Wyatt attended Miss Chapin's School, where she had roles as Joan of Arc and as Shylock. She later attended two years of Barnard College. After leaving Barnard, she joined the apprentice school of the Berkshire Playhouse at Stockbridge, Massachusetts, where for six months she played a variety of roles.

Stage and film

One of her first jobs on Broadway was as understudy to Rose Hobart in a production of Trade Winds—a career move that cost her her listing in the New York Social Register (she later was relisted upon her marriage). Receiving favorable notices on Broadway and celebrated for her understated beauty, Wyatt made the transition from stage to screen and was placed under contract by Universal Pictures.

She made her film debut in 1934 in One More River. In arguably her most famous film role, she co-starred as Ronald Colman's character's love interest in Frank Capra's Columbia Pictures film Lost Horizon (1937). She reflected on  Lost Horizon  sixty years later in St. Anthony Messenger magazine:
During the war, they cut out all the pacifist parts of the film—the High Lama talking about peace in the world. All that was cut because they were trying to inspire those G.I.'s to get out there and go "bang! bang! bang!" which sort of ruined the film.

Other film appearances included Gentleman's Agreement with Gregory Peck, None but the Lonely Heart with Cary Grant, Boomerang with Dana Andrews, and Our Very Own with Farley Granger. Wyatt co-starred in the crime dramas Pitfall and House by the River, and with Randolph Scott in a Western, Canadian Pacific. She played the wife of Gary Cooper in the war story Task Force.

Her film career suffered due to her outspoken opposition to Senator Joseph McCarthy, the chief figure in the anti-Communist investigations of that era, and was temporarily derailed for having assisted in hosting a performance by the Bolshoi Ballet during the Second World War, though it was at the request of President Franklin D. Roosevelt. Wyatt returned to her roots on the New York stage for a time and appeared in such plays as Lillian Hellman's The Autumn Garden, opposite Fredric March.

Television
For many people, Wyatt is best remembered as Margaret Anderson on Father Knows Best, which aired from 1954 to 1960. She played opposite Robert Young as the devoted wife and mother of the Anderson family in the small town of Springfield. This role won consecutive Emmy Awards for her in 1958, 1959 and 1960 for best actress in a comedy series. After Father Knows Best, Wyatt guest-starred in several other series.

On June 13, 1962, she was cast in the lead in "The Heather Mahoney Story" on NBC's Wagon Train. In 1963, she portrayed Kitty McMullen in "Don't Forget to Say Goodbye" on the ABC drama Going My Way, with Gene Kelly and Leo G. Carroll, a series about the Catholic priesthood in New York City. In 1964 Wyatt appeared as Mrs. Sarah Brynmar on The Virginian in the episode "The Secret of Brynmar Hall". In 1965, Wyatt was cast as Anne White in "The Monkey's Paw – A Retelling" on CBS's The Alfred Hitchcock Hour.
 
Wyatt portrayed Amanda Grayson, Spock's mother and Ambassador Sarek's (Mark Lenard) wife, in the 1967 episode "Journey to Babel" of the original NBC series Star Trek, and the 1986 film Star Trek IV: The Voyage Home. Wyatt was once quoted as saying her fan mail for these two appearances in this role exceeded that of Lost Horizon.

In 1969, she made a guest appearance on Here Come the Brides, but did not have any scenes with Mark Lenard, who was starring on the show as sawmill owner Aaron Stemple.  Also in 1969, Wyatt appeared as a concerned mother in the first episode of the ABC comedy anthology series Love, American Style in a segment titled "Love and the Pill."

In 1970, Wyatt guest-starred in the episode "Wedding Day?????" (the five question marks being part of the title) in the second season of the TV sitcom The Ghost & Mrs. Muir, which played on ABC (the first season having played on NBC). She portrayed Emily Williams, the mother of Mrs. Muir.

In 1976, she guest-starred in an episode of Gibbsville, and she appeared as Anna, mother of the Virgin Mary, in the 1978 television film The Nativity. Late in her career, she appeared in a recurring role in the 1980s medical drama St. Elsewhere, as Katherine Auschlander, wife of hospital administrator Dr. Daniel Auschlander (Norman Lloyd).

Personal life
Wyatt was married to investment broker Edgar Bethune Ward from November 9, 1935, until his death on November 8, 2000. The couple met in the late 1920s when both were weekend houseguests of Franklin D. Roosevelt at Hyde Park, New York. 

Ward later converted to the Catholic faith of his wife. Wyatt suffered a mild stroke in the 1990s but recovered well. She remained in relatively good health for the rest of her long life.

Death
Wyatt died on October 20, 2006, at her home in Bel-Air, California, aged 96. Wyatt's family included three grandchildren and five great-grandchildren.

Filmography

Television films

Radio appearances

References

External links

 
 
 
 
 

 Jane Wyatt: Representative of American Liberalism; article by Norman Markowitz, politicalaffairs.net; accessed February 2, 2014.
 "'Father Knows Best' mother Wyatt dead at 96", CNN.com; accessed February 2, 2014.
 

1910 births
2006 deaths
20th-century American actresses
Actresses from New York City
American film actresses
American stage actresses
American television actresses
Barnard College alumni
California Democrats
Catholics from New York (state)
Chapin School (Manhattan) alumni
Jane Waddington
New York (state) Democrats
Outstanding Performance by a Lead Actress in a Comedy Series Primetime Emmy Award winners
People from Franklin Lakes, New Jersey
Jane Waddington
Jane Waddington